Roy McArthur Hopkins, known as Hoppy Hopkins (June 10, 1943 – November 23, 2006), was a Democratic member of the Louisiana House of Representatives for District 1 in northern Caddo Parish and two precincts in northern Bossier Parish from 1988 until his Thanksgiving Day death after a long illness of bone cancer. In 1966, Hopkins moved his family to Oil City (population 1,008 in the 2010 U.S. census) and made his living there as an automobile dealer.

Previously, Hopkins, had been an alderman and mayor of Oil City. In 1979, he was elected to the Caddo Parish Police Jury, which became the Caddo Parish Commission in December 1984. Hopkins was elected by his colleagues as the first president of the Caddo Parish Commission. Two Republican commissioners, Tommy Gene Armstrong and Lloyd E. Lenard, served thereafter as the second and third presidents of the commission, respectively.

Hopkins was born in the village of Murchison near Athens in Henderson 
County, Texas. He was a veteran of the United States Army, having been stationed in Germany during the Cold War.

Hopkins wins five House elections

Hopkins won his House seat when the GOP incumbent Bruce Newton Lynn, I, of Gilliam decided not to seek re-election in 1987. Hopkins defeated the Fourth Congressional District Republican chairman, Kenneth "Ken" Frazier, and a fellow Democrat, Norbert Johnson. Hopkins polled 6,756 votes (53 percent) to Frazier's 5,128 (40 percent), and Johnson's 813 ballots (6 percent). Frazier's campaign against Hopkins was the last to have been managed by former State Republican Chairman George Joseph Despot (1927–1991) of Shreveport.

Another Republican, David Hunter, tried unsuccessfully to defeat Hopkins in 1991. Hopkins polled 8,187 (73 percent) to Hunter's 2,964 (27 percent). Republicans left Hopkins unopposed in the 1995, 1999, and 2003 primaries. However, two Democrats, attorney Kirby Kelly and Philip Green, challenged him in 2003. Hopkins received 6,861 votes that year to Kelly's 2,322 (24 percent) and Green's 606 ballots (6 percent)

His legislative tenure

In the House, Hopkins supported the LSU Health Sciences Center in Shreveport and the establishment of the Louisiana State Oil and Natural Gas Museum in Oil City. He also wrote legislation that divided riverboat taxes among local governments.

The Shreveport Times, his regional newspaper, described Hopkins as having a great sense of humor and a "biting wit" but "adept at getting bills passed and maneuvering behind the scenes to kill legislation he opposed." Hopkins was a veteran member of the important House Appropriations Committee. He was elected by the legislative delegation of the Fourth Congressional District to serve as its representative on the state House panel.

A colleague and close friend, Representative Billy Montgomery, a Democrat-turned-Republican from Haughton in Bossier Parish, told the Shreveport Times that Hopkins was a "team player" who had a good relationship with almost everybody. . . . He led because people liked him so much."

Hopkins authored a bill to provide health benefits to lawmakers who had served prior to the installation of term limits. The bill passed, but Democratic Governor Kathleen Babineaux Blanco vetoed the bill at the "urging of Republican lawmakers, many of whom had voted for the legislation ... People never understood that Hoppy wasn't doing that for himself. He was just thinking about other members. He already had [his own] insurance ... and retirement," Montgomery explained.

Representative Wayne Waddell, a Shreveport Republican first elected in a 1997 special election to succeed Republican Roy L. Brun, who became a state district judge, said that he voted for the health-benefits bill because it "means too much to Hoppy."

Then House Speaker Joe Salter, a Democrat from Florien in Sabine Parish, said that Hopkins could not be pressured to support or oppose legislation. Salter noted that the commissioner of administration once threatened Hopkins about projects in north Caddo Parish. "Hoppy told him to go ahead and pull the damn things, but he wasn't voting" as the commissioner requested, Salter said.

Billy Montgomery told The Times that ethics laws were unneeded for legislators like Hopkins: "He just had common sense, and he was a good person. If you want to pattern yourself, as an alderman, a small town mayor or a member of a legislature, he's the pattern to follow."

An avid golfer and hunter, Hopkins was a member of the Monterey Country Club in Vivian and was among a regular group of House members who managed to play nine holes of golf before morning committee meetings during legislative sessions, noted The Times. The same was also said of an earlier occupant of the north Caddo House seat, James H. "Jimmy" Wilson (1931–1986), a Democrat and later Republican from Vivian.

Last rites

Hopkins was survived by his wife, the former Rosemarie "Rose" Duddeck (born 1945), and two sons, Todd Andreas Hopkins (born 1963) and wife Karen Hopkins and Garry Romain Hopkins (born 1966), all of Oil City; four sisters, Alma Lee Thompson and Opal McCool, both of Fort Worth, Fayreen Tiner of Tyler, and Bonnie Ruth Holsomback of Frankston, Texas; one brother, Joe Dan Hopkins of Jacksonville, Texas; three grandchildren, Brandon Hopkins, Rachel Garlington, and Meredith LeBlanc, and two great-grandchildren.

Services were held on November 28, 2006, in the 300-seat United Pentecostal Church of Oil City, with the Reverends Johnny Peden, Gerald Trammell, and H. A. McFarland officiating. Todd Hopkins eulogized his father as "my mentor, ... my hero, and my friend. We will miss him, but we know that he is in a better place. He fought a good fight." When the church sanctuary filled, mourners were directed to an overflow area in the gymnasium.

Speaker Salter told the mourners that "Hoppy was always faithful in terms of his service. Even when he was ill, he would come to the sessions. He demonstrated his desire to serve in spite of his illness." Salter added that Hopkins was "tremendously brave when he faced death. He talked about it and made plans. And he never questioned why. It was quite a testimony the way he faced death."

Governor Blanco arrived in Oil City, having first attended the inauguration of outgoing state Representative Cedric Bradford Glover as the first black mayor of Shreveport. She missed the service itself but attended the burial in Lakeview Memorial Gardens and met privately afterward with Mrs. Hopkins. Pallbearers included Judge Roy Brun, Wayne Taylor, Patrick Wooldridge, Dan Turner, Dr. John Haynes, and Charlie Alexander. Hopkins and Brun were initially elected to the legislature in 1987 and developed an interparty friendship over the years.

The Hopkins family requested memorials to the Oil and Gas Museum in Oil City 71601. Oil City is located on Louisiana Highway 1 north of Caddo Lake and south of the Arkansas state line.

Hopkins was honored two months before his death by the naming of "Roy 'Hoppy' Hopkins Drive", the entrance to the Caddo Parish Ward II Industrial Park near Vivian.

In a special election held on February 24, 2007, to choose Hopkins' successor, the Republican Jim Morris, a Caddo Parish commissioner, received 69 percent of the vote and defeated two other Republicans and two Democrats. Morris then won a full term in the nonpartisan blanket primary held on October 20, 2007.=

References

http://www.shreveporttimes.com/apps/pbcs.dll/article?AID=/20061124/NEWS01/611240314
http://www.legacy.com/shreveporttimes/Obituaries.asp?Page=Lifestory&PersonId=20030777
http://www.sos.louisiana.gov/museums/oil/oil-index.htm
http://www.sos.louisiana.gov:8090/cgibin/?rqstyp=elcpr&rqsdta=10248709
http://www.sos.louisiana.gov:8090/cgibin/?rqstyp=elcpr&rqsdta=10040309
http://www.sos.louisiana.gov:8090/cgibin/?rqstyp=elcpr&rqsdta=10199109
http://www.sos.louisiana.gov:8090/cgibin/?rqstyp=elcpr&rqsdta=02240709
http://www.shreveporttimes.com/apps/pbcs.dll/article?AID=/20061128/BREAKINGNEWS/61128025
http://www.caddo.org/Minutes/September%2021st,%202006.pdf

1943 births
2006 deaths
Democratic Party members of the Louisiana House of Representatives
Mayors of places in Louisiana
Louisiana city council members
Parish jurors and commissioners in Louisiana
Politicians from Shreveport, Louisiana
Businesspeople from Louisiana
American Pentecostals
United States Army soldiers
Deaths from bone cancer
20th-century American politicians
People from Caddo Parish, Louisiana
People from Henderson County, Texas
20th-century American businesspeople